Lovers, Friends and Strangers is the sixth solo studio album released by American country music singer, Barbara Mandrell, released in May 1977. The album peaked at number 26 on the Billboard Top Country Albums chart. "Hold Me", the album's only single, peaked at number 12 on the Billboard Hot Country Songs chart.

Mandrell's success was beginning to build with the release of this album. "Married, But Not to Each Other", the second single from her previous album, Midnight Angel, had peaked at number three on the Billboard county singles chart, which lead to its inclusion on Lovers, Friends, and Strangers. A cover version of "After the Lovin'" was included, which exemplified the type of songs Mandrell was recording at the time. This track was also nominated for a Grammy the following year for Best Female Performance – Country.  Like many of her following albums, Lovers, Friends, & Strangers consisted of 10 tracks, instead of 11 like on her previous two releases, This Is Barbara Mandrell and Midnight Angel.

Track listing
"She's Loved Me Out of You" – 2:56 (Dean Dillon, Gary Harrison)
"Married, But Not to Each Other" – 2:56 (Denise LaSalle, Frances Miller)
"This Is Not Another Cheatin' Song" – 2:47 (Rose Lee Maphis, Joe Maphis)
"How Long Does It Take" – 2:49 (Dillon)
"Bedroom Reunion" – 3:30 (Dillon, Johnny McCollum)
"Hold Me" – 2:54 (Glenn Ray)
"We Are the One" – 2:52 (Kent Robbins)
"After the Lovin'" – 3:27 (Alan Bernstein, Ritchie Adams)
"Lovers, Friends, and Strangers" – 2:42 (Robbins)
"Let My Man Go, Jesus" – 2:52 (Don Devaney)

Personnel
Barbara Mandrell - lead vocals
The Holladay Singers, The Lea Jane Singers - backing vocals
Bobby Thompson - banjo
Mike Leech, Steve Schaffer - bass guitar
Hayward Bishop, Kenny Malone - drums
Tommy Williams - fiddle
Jimmy Capps, Steve Gibson, Glenn Keener, Chip Young, Reggie Young - guitar
Charlie McCoy, Terry McMillan - harmonica
Farrell Morris - percussion
David Briggs, Bobby Ogdin, Hargus "Pig" Robbins - piano
John Hughey, Hal Rugg - steel guitar
George Binkley III, Marvin Chantry, Roy Christensen, Carl Gorodetzky, Lennid Haight, Sheldon Kurland, Ann Migliore, Steven Smith, Donald Teal, Gary Vanosdale - strings
Archie Jordan - string arrangements (tracks 2,5,6,8)
Farrell Morris - vibraphone

Charts
Album – Billboard (North America)

Singles – Billboard (North America)

References

1977 albums
Barbara Mandrell albums
Dot Records albums
Albums produced by Tom Collins (record producer)